Suju or Su Ju may refer to:

 Suzhou opera
 Super Junior